Božidar Senčar (1927–1987) was a Croatian football midfielder who started playing for his hometown club Dinamo Zagreb in Yugoslav First League in 1946.

Club career
After spending a season and a half with Dinamo he was picked up by Partizan during the 1947–48 season where he spent the following three seasons, helping them win the Yugoslav championship in 1949. In 1950 he returned to Dinamo and won the Yugoslav Cup in 1951. In 1952 he left Dinamo again, this time to join their biggest Croatian rivals, Hajduk Split, with whom he reached the Yugoslav Cup final in 1953 (which Hajduk lost to BSK Belgrade 2–0). After two seasons at Hajduk, Senčar returned to Zagreb and joined NK Zagreb where he played a single season before joining German giants Bayern Munich for the 1956–57 season. His last stop was at NAC Breda where he had only three appearances in the last season of his professional career, before retiring in 1958.

International career
Senčar made his debut for Yugoslavia in a 1950 World Cup qualifier against Israel on 21 August 1949 in Belgrade which Yugoslavia won 6–0. Senčar scored his only international goal in the 44th minute after a hat-trick by Miloš Pajević. He later appeared at the away game against Israel in September 1949, but was subsequently dropped from the squad led by Milorad Arsenijević to the 1950 World Cup. After the World Cup he earned one more cap in a friendly against Italy in May 1951.

Honours
Yugoslav First League
Winner (1): 1948–49 (with Partizan)
Yugoslav Cup
Winner (1): 1951 (with Dinamo Zagreb)
Runner-up (1): 1953 (with Hajduk Split)

References

External links
 
 Player profile on Yugoslavia National Team page 
 Božidar Senčar at Povijest Dinama 

1927 births
1987 deaths
Footballers from Zagreb
Association football midfielders
Yugoslav footballers
Yugoslavia international footballers
GNK Dinamo Zagreb players
FK Partizan players
HNK Hajduk Split players
NK Zagreb players
FC Bayern Munich footballers
NAC Breda players
Yugoslav First League players
Bundesliga players
Eredivisie players
Yugoslav expatriate footballers
Expatriate footballers in West Germany
Yugoslav expatriate sportspeople in West Germany
Expatriate footballers in the Netherlands
Yugoslav expatriate sportspeople in the Netherlands